Bela plicatella is an extinct species of sea snail, a marine gastropod mollusk in the family Mangeliidae.

Description

Distribution
This extinct marine species was found in Pleistocene strata in Italy and in Pliocene strata in the Alpes-Maritimes, France

References

 Cossmann (M.), 1896 Essais de Paléoconchologie comparée (2ème livraison), p. 1-179

External links
  Della Bella G., Naldi F. & Scarponi D. (2015). Molluschi marini del Plio-Pleistocene dell'Emilia-Romagna e della Toscana - Superfamiglia Conoidea, vol. 4, Mangeliidae II. Lavori della Società Italiana di Malacologia. 26: 1-80

plicatella
Gastropods described in 1847